The Right to Be Happy is a 1916 American silent Christmas fantasy film directed by Rupert Julian. The film is based on the 1843 novella A Christmas Carol by Charles Dickens. The movie stars Rupert Julian as Ebenezer Scrooge and Claire McDowell as Mrs. Cratchit.

The Bluebird photoplay was produced by Universal and released on December 25, 1916.



Plot
The film is a retelling of Charles Dickens' A Christmas Carol, recounting the story of Ebenezer Scrooge, played by Rupert Julian. Scrooge is an elderly miser and curmudgeon. Alone in his room on Christmas Eve, he is visited by the ghost of his former business partner Jacob Marley portrayed by Harry Carter. Marley’s ghost tells Scrooge three spirits will visit him over the next three nights.

Scrooge's first visit is by the Ghost of Christmas Past played by Wadsworth Harris. The Ghost shows Scrooge's development from a young boy to a young man. He sees how he started to become a miser.

Then, the Ghost of Christmas Present played by Richard L'Estrange appears, who shows Scrooge how the Cratchit family has fared. He finds out, unless the future changes, the Cratchit's disabled son, Tiny Tim featuring (Frankie Lee), will die.

The last spirit Scrooge meets is The Ghost of the Future played by (Tom Figee). This figure shows Scrooge scenes of people discussing someone's death. Nobody in the room seems concerned about the dead person. Scrooge doesn't know who the dead man is. Then, he finds out Tiny Tim has also passed. Next, Scrooge discovers he is the man whose death is celebrated.

He vows to change his ways and become a new person. Finally, Scrooge wakes up at home and finds out all the spiritual visits had happened during Christmas Eve. He also finds out today is Christmas Day.

Each visit positively changed Scrooge; he transforms into a kinder, gentler man full of Christmas spirit.

Cast
{| 
! style="width: 180px; text-align: left;" |Actor
! style="width: 230px; text-align: left;" |Role
|- style="text-align: left;"
|Rupert Julian||Ebenezer Scrooge
|-
|John Cook||Bob Cratchit
|-
|Claire McDowell||Mrs. Cratchit
|-
|Frankie Lee||Tiny Tim
|-
|Harry Carter||Jacob Marley
|-
|Emory Johnson||Fred, Scrooge's Nephew
|-
|Francelia Billington||Scrooge's Sweetheart
|-
|Lydia Yeamans Titus||Mrs. Fezziwig
|-
|Wadsworth Harris||Ghost of Christmas Past
|-
|Richard L'Estrange||Ghost of Christmas Present
|-
|Tom Figee||The Ghost of the Future
|-
|Roberta Wilson||Caroline
|-
|}

Preservation status
According to the Library of Congress website, this film has a current status of  “No holdings located in archives,” thus it is presumed all copies of this film are lost.

Gallery

See also
 List of Christmas films
 Adaptations of A Christmas Carol

Notes

References

External links

 
 
 

1916 films
1916 drama films
1916 lost films
American black-and-white films
American Christmas horror films
American silent feature films
Films based on A Christmas Carol
Films directed by Rupert Julian
Lost American films
Universal Pictures films
1910s American films
Silent horror films